not to be confused with António José Severim de Noronha, 1st Duke of Terceira

D. Antão de Noronha was appointed in 1564 under Sebastian of Portugal as vice-roy of India. Previously, he had been captain at Hormuz in the 1550s and served at Ceuta in the 1540s. He was the illegitimate son of D. João de Noronha and nephew of viceroy D. Afonso de Noronha (1550-1554). D. Antão de Noronha was also the Viceroy of Portuguese India between 3 September 1564 and September 1568. He captured Mangalore and built a fort there in 1568. He died in 1569 on board in his voyage back to Portugal.

References

Bibliography 

Vila-Santa, Nuno, "O Vice-Reinado de D. Antão de Noronha (1564-1568) no contexto da crise do Estado da Índia de 1565-1575", Anais de História de Além-Mar, vol. XI, Lisboa/Ponta Delgada, 2010, pp. 63–101.

History of Mangalore
16th-century Portuguese people
Christianity in Mangalore
Viceroys of Portuguese India
Captain-majors of Ceilão